Christoph Schütz (6 November 1689 in Umstadt, Germany - 4 January 1750 in Bad Homburg, Germany) was a pietist writer and a songbook publisher.

Schütz's book, Die Güldene Rose. . . von der Wiederbringung Aller Dinge (The Golden Rose . . . on the Restoration of All Things) influenced George Rapp and his Harmony Society so much at one point that they used the symbol of the rose and the Bible verse Micah 4:8 as the symbol of their communal society for a couple of years.

Radical Pietism
German non-fiction writers
German Christian religious leaders
1689 births
1750 deaths
18th-century Christian mystics
Protestant mystics
German male non-fiction writers